The Future and the Past is the second studio album by American singer-songwriter Natalie Prass. It was released in June 2018 under ATO Records.

Production
Natalie Prass revealed on May 1, 2017, the she had finished writing her second studio album, with the help of singer-songwriter and producer Matthew E. White. The album was recorded at Spacebomb Studios.

Release
On February 26, 2018, Prass announced the release of her second studio album, along with the first single "Short Court Style". Olivia Horn of Pitchfork described the single as "the song’s texture is laid down by a deep-set bass groove, twinkly disco synth, and sampled “woo!”s that puncture every break. Prass rides a wave of ecstatic vocal harmonies in and out of the chorus, where she sings plainly about a love that conquers all." On March 22, 2018, Prass performed the single on Conan.

The second single "Sisters" was released on March 28, 2018.

On May 1, 2018, the third single "Lost" was released. Prass explained the single is about "putting your foot down in a relationship when enough is enough. It's the journey of getting engulfed in another person's energy, good and bad, and ultimately understanding the other person is out to hurt you and not there to love you back."

Critical reception
The Future and the Past was met with "universal acclaim" reviews from critics. At Metacritic, which assigns a weighted average rating out of 100 to reviews from mainstream publications, this release received an average score of 82 based on 20 reviews. Aggregator Album of the Year gave the release a 80 out of 100 based on a critical consensus of 22 reviews.

Accolades

Track listing
Track listing adapted from Tidal.

Charts

Release history

References

2018 albums
Natalie Prass albums
ATO Records albums